Veikko Olavi Martikainen (born 25 July 1941, in Lapinlahti) is a Finnish farmer and politician. He was Deputy Minister of Social Affairs and Health from 15 May 1977 to 26 May 1979 and served as a Member of the Parliament of Finland from 1972 to 1987, representing the Centre Party. He was the Governor of Kuopio Province from 1993 to 1997.

References

1941 births
Living people
People from Lapinlahti
Centre Party (Finland) politicians
Government ministers of Finland
Members of the Parliament of Finland (1972–75)
Members of the Parliament of Finland (1975–79)
Members of the Parliament of Finland (1979–83)
Members of the Parliament of Finland (1983–87)